Nawngsansaing is a village in Homalin Township, Hkamti District, in the Sagaing Region of northwestern Burma. It is located south of Hmangin.

References

External links
Maplandia World Gazetteer

Populated places in Hkamti District
Homalin Township